The Apprentice is a 2002 novel written by Tess Gerritsen, second book of the Maura Isles/Jane Rizzoli series. Both the hardcover and paperback editions reached number 10 in The New York Times Best Seller lists.

Plot
When Rizzoli investigates a murder where cutting techniques similar to those of imprisoned Warren Hoyt but involving necrophilia (as determined by medical examiner Maura Isles), she is called by FBI Agent Gabriel Dean to Washington, D.C. Dean shows her a list of similar crimes committed in Bosnia, and terms the suspect "The Dominator".

Hoyt escapes from prison after reading about "The Dominator's" murders which copy many of his techniques, and plots with him to trap Rizzoli. Eventually, "The Dominator" kidnaps Rizzoli as she returns to Boston, and takes her into the countryside. In her struggle to stay alive, Rizzoli fights back, kills "The Dominator" and severely wounds Hoyt, making him a quadriplegic.

Rizzoli then takes a long-overdue vacation, claiming sick-leave, with Dean.

References

2000s horror novels
2002 American novels
American horror novels